Rui Veloso is the fourth album by Rui Veloso, released in late 1986.

Recording
The album was recorded between April 1985 and November 1986.

Track listing
All tracks were recorded by Rui Veloso and Carlos Tê with some exceptions.

Certifications and sales

References

External links
Rui Veloso at Rate Your Music

1986 albums
Rui Veloso albums